The Cronin Omnibus is a single volume of three A. J. Cronin novels: Hatter's Castle, The Citadel, and The Keys of the Kingdom.  It was first published in 1958 by Gollancz.

1958 British novels
Books by A. J. Cronin
Victor Gollancz Ltd books